Elaphria cornutinus is a species of moth in the family Noctuidae. It was described by Sandra V. Saluke and Michael G. Pogue in 2000 and is found in North America, where it has been recorded from south-eastern United States (Oklahoma, Arkansas, Mississippi, Missouri, Kentucky, Tennessee, Alabama, south-eastern Michigan, Ohio, and Maryland).

The length of the forewings is 9–12 mm. Adults are on wing from March to September.

The MONA or Hodges number for Elaphria cornutinus is 9681.2.

References

Further reading
 Arnett, Ross H. (2000). American Insects: A Handbook of the Insects of America North of Mexico. CRC Press.
 Lafontaine, J. Donald & Schmidt, B. Christian (2010). "Annotated check list of the Noctuoidea (Insecta, Lepidoptera) of North America north of Mexico". ZooKeys, vol. 40, 1-239.

External links
Butterflies and Moths of North America
NCBI Taxonomy Browser, Elaphria cornutinus

Noctuidae
Moths described in 2000